Thai Sikh International School (TSIS;) is an international school that has been operating since 1985. The school has two very well equipped campuses. The Senior School, which educates students in Years 7 - Years 13, is located near Bearing BTS Station in Samut Prakan, in the Bangkok Metropolitan Area. The Junior School, which educates children from Nursery to Year 6 is located in Wongwianyai district of Bangkok. 

The school offers the UK National Curriculum for students at all levels.

The school is partially funded by the Thai Sikh Foundation in Pahurat, Phra Nakhon District, Bangkok. The Thai Sikh Foundation handed management of the school to International Schools Services (ISS) in August 2017. ISS is associated with over 300 schools around the world and after major campus renovations, is working to renew the school in cooperation with the Thai Sikh Foundation.

While tuition fees have increased since management by ISS commenced, the fees are competitive in comparison to many of Bangkok's international schools. Because it is a voluntary aided school, in 2004, it charged school tuition rates that are among the lowest in Thailand.

Both school campuses have exceptional, age appropriate facilities such as swimming pools, basketball and tennis courts as well as a 400-metre running track around a football field.

While historically the majority of TSIS' students were of Indian descent, the student population is becoming more diverse as student of all nations are welcomed. Currently, about 20% of the students are Sikh.

The Senior campus is located on the eastern edge of Bangkok in the Mueang Samut Prakan District. The school site is over 30 rai in size. The campus includes an administrative block, a gymnasium and auditorium, air-conditioned assembly hall, art centre, computer laboratories, language centre, music centre, science laboratories and swimming pool.

References

External links
Thai Sikh International School Official website

International schools in the Bangkok Metropolitan Region
Education in Samutprakan province
Buildings and structures in Samut Prakan province
Educational institutions established in 1985
1985 establishments in Thailand